The ZRCV was a large dirigible aircraft carrier proposed by the Lighter-than-Air Bureau of the Navy Department and the Goodyear-Zeppelin Corporation.  It would have been a nine-million cubic foot airship designed to carry nine Douglas-Northrop BT–1 dive bombers.

Building the ZRCV became impossible when the Roosevelt administration placed an upper limit on the size of new airships.

Origin of name
Previous Navy airships had used the designation "ZR" (Zeppelin Rigid), which was combined with the designation for aircraft carriers, "CV" (Carrier aViation).

References

External links
Goodyear and the ZRCV Airship

Airborne aircraft carriers